Ahmad Tejan Sillah, Sierra Leonean imam
Foday Sillah (born 1974) Sierra Leonean sprinter
Mohamed Sillah, Sierra Leonean politician
Mohamed Sillah (footballer) (born 1983), Sierra Leonean footballer
Sadiq Sillah (born 1969), Sierra Leonean politician

See also
Scilla (name)
Scylla (disambiguation)
Silla (name)
Sylla